The 2004–05 Vancouver Canucks season was the team's 35th season in the NHL. However, the entire season's games were cancelled as a result of the 2004–05 NHL lockout.

Schedule
The Canucks regular season schedule was announced on July 14, 2004. Their preseason schedule was released on August 10, 2004.

|-
| 1 || September 24 || @ Edmonton Oilers
|-
| 2 || September 25 || @ Calgary Flames
|-
| 3 || September 26 || Anaheim Mighty Ducks
|-
| 4 || September 30 || @ San Jose Sharks
|-
| 5 || October 3 || @ Anaheim Mighty Ducks
|-
| 6 || October 5 || Edmonton Oilers
|-
| 7 || October 7 || San Jose Sharks
|-
| 8 || October 8 || Calgary Flames
|-

|-
| 1 || October 13 || @ San Jose Sharks
|-
| 2 || October 16 || Detroit Red Wings
|-
| 3 || October 19 || @ Calgary Flames
|-
| 4 || October 20 || St. Louis Blues
|-
| 5 || October 22 || Minnesota Wild
|-
| 6 || October 24 || Columbus Blue Jackets
|-
| 7 || October 26 || Calgary Flames
|-
| 8 || October 28 || @ Minnesota Wild
|-
| 9 || October 30 || @ Colorado Avalanche
|-
| 10 || November 2 || Colorado Avalanche
|-
| 11 || November 5 || Nashville Predators
|-
| 12 || November 7 || Anaheim Mighty Ducks
|-
| 13 || November 10 || @ Colorado Avalanche
|-
| 14 || November 11 || @ Phoenix Coyotes
|-
| 15 || November 13 || @ San Jose Sharks
|-
| 16 || November 17 || Chicago Blackhawks
|-
| 17 || November 19 || Nashville Predators
|-
| 18 || November 21 || Minnesota Wild
|-
| 19 || November 23 || @ Atlanta Thrashers
|-
| 20 || November 24 || @ Tampa Bay Lightning
|-
| 21 || November 26 || @ Florida Panthers
|-
| 22 || November 28 || @ Carolina Hurricanes
|-
| 23 || November 30 || @ Nashville Predators
|-
| 24 || December 2 || Calgary Flames
|-
| 25 || December 4 || Toronto Maple Leafs
|-
| 26 || December 6 || Columbus Blue Jackets
|-
| 27 || December 9 || @ Calgary Flames
|-
| 28 || December 10 || Detroit Red Wings
|-
| 29 || December 12 || @ Columbus Blue Jackets
|-
| 30 || December 14 || @ Pittsburgh Penguins
|-
| 31 || December 16 || @ Detroit Red Wings
|-
| 32 || December 18 || Edmonton Oilers
|-
| 33 || December 21 || Los Angeles Kings
|-
| 34 || December 23 || Phoenix Coyotes
|-
| 35 || December 26 || @ Edmonton Oilers
|-
| 36 || December 27 || Philadelphia Flyers
|-
| 37 || December 29 || Montreal Canadiens
|-
| 38 || December 31 || @ Detroit Red Wings
|-
| 39 || January 1 || @ Buffalo Sabres
|-
| 40 || January 4 || @ St. Louis Blues
|-
| 41 || January 6 || @ Colorado Avalanche
|-
| 42 || January 8 || Dallas Stars
|-
| 43 || January 10 || San Jose Sharks
|-
| 44 || January 12 || Ottawa Senators
|-
| 45 || January 14 || @ Anaheim Mighty Ducks
|-
| 46 || January 15 || @ Los Angeles Kings
|-
| 47 || January 20 || @ Minnesota Wild
|-
| 48 || January 22 || @ Edmonton Oilers
|-
| 49 || January 23 || New York Islanders
|-
| 50 || January 25 || New Jersey Devils
|-
| 51 || January 27 || Edmonton Oilers
|-
| 52 || January 31 || Colorado Avalanche
|-
| 53 || February 2 || New York Rangers
|-
| 54 || February 5 || @ Toronto Maple Leafs
|-
| 55 || February 7 || @ Ottawa Senators
|-
| 56 || February 8 || @ Montreal Canadiens
|-
| 57 || February 10 || @ Calgary Flames
|-
| 58 || February 15 || San Jose Sharks
|-
| 59 || February 19 || Calgary Flames
|-
| 60 || February 22 || Boston Bruins
|-
| 61 || February 24 || @ St. Louis Blues
|-
| 62 || February 25 || @ Nashville Predators
|-
| 63 || February 27 || @ Dallas Stars
|-
| 64 || March 1 || Phoenix Coyotes
|-
| 65 || March 3 || @ Phoenix Coyotes
|-
| 66 || March 5 || @ Los Angeles Kings
|-
| 67 || March 6 || @ Anaheim Mighty Ducks
|-
| 68 || March 8 || Chicago Blackhawks
|-
| 69 || March 10 || St. Louis Blues
|-
| 70 || March 14 || Minnesota Wild
|-
| 71 || March 17 || @ Chicago Blackhawks
|-
| 72 || March 18 || @ Columbus Blue Jackets
|-
| 73 || March 20 || @ Dallas Stars
|-
| 74 || March 22 || Colorado Avalanche
|-
| 75 || March 24 || Washington Capitals
|-
| 76 || March 26 || Los Angeles Kings
|-
| 77 || March 30 || Dallas Stars
|-
| 78 || April 1 || @ Chicago Blackhawks
|-
| 79 || April 2 || @ Minnesota Wild
|-
| 80 || April 4 || Anaheim Mighty Ducks
|-
| 81 || April 7 || Edmonton Oilers
|-
| 82 || April 9 || @ Edmonton Oilers
|-

Transactions
The Canucks were involved in the following transactions from June 8, 2004, the day after the deciding game of the 2004 Stanley Cup Finals, through February 16, 2005, the day the  season was officially cancelled.

Trades

Players acquired

Players lost

Signings

Draft picks
Vancouver's picks at the 2004 NHL Entry Draft, which was held at the RBC Center in Raleigh, North Carolina on June 26–27, 2004.

Notes

References

Vancouver Canucks seasons
Vancouver C
Vancouver
Vancouver Canucks
Vancouver Canucks